Zemtsovo is a rural locality (a village) in Kemskoye Rural Settlement, Nikolsky District, Vologda Oblast, Russia. The population was 2 as of 2002.

Geography 
Zemtsovo is located 48 km southwest of Nikolsk (the district's administrative centre) by road. Kaino is the nearest rural locality.

References 

Rural localities in Nikolsky District, Vologda Oblast